Fernanda Bullano (married name Dobile, 26 September 1914 – 16 November 2003) was an Italian sprinter. She was born in Turin and died in Venaria Reale.

Achievements

National titles
Fernanda Bullano has won three times the individual national championship.
2 wins in 100 metres (1934, 1935)
1 win in 200 metres (1937)

See also
 Italy national relay team

References

External links
 

1914 births
2003 deaths
Italian female sprinters
Athletes (track and field) at the 1936 Summer Olympics
Sportspeople from Turin
Olympic athletes of Italy
Olympic female sprinters